Grayson|Reed are an American Christian music duo from Nashville, Tennessee, and they started making music together in 2016. They released an extended play, Walk (2017), with Centricity Music. This release charted on two Billboard magazine charts.

Background
Grayson|Reed are a husband-and-wife duo based in Nashville, Tennessee, where he was the lead singer with Mikeschair, and she was half of the group City Harbor.

Music history
Their first release, an extended play, Walk, was released on January 13, 2017, with Centricity Music. The extended play charted on two Billboard magazine charts, where it peaked on the Christian Albums at No. 21, and No. 12 on the Heatseekers Albums.

Members
 Michael Alan "Mike" Grayson (born October 21, 1984, Orlando, Florida)
 Molly Elizabeth Reed Grayson (born February 5, 1985, East Aurora, New York)

Discography
EPs

References

External links

American musical duos
Musical groups established in 2016
Musical groups from Nashville, Tennessee
2016 establishments in Tennessee